Jänessaari is a district of the city of Turku, in Finland. It is located in the northwestern part of the island of Hirvensalo, off the city's coast.

Jänessaari is one of the smallest districts in Turku, with a population of only 26. 11.54% of the district's population are under 15 years old, while 26.92% are over 65. The district's linguistic makeup is 92.31% Finnish, 3.85% Swedish, and 3.85% other.

See also
 Districts of Turku
 Districts of Turku by population

Districts of Turku